Joëlle Brupbacher (3 August 1978 – 22 May 2011) was a Swiss mountaineer.

Brupbacher lived in Muri bei Bern and was employed as an IT specialist with Swiss Federal Railways.  She was the first Swiss woman to climb five of the fourteen eight-thousanders.

After reaching the summit of the Makalu, an 8485-metre-high mountain in Nepal, and descending to Camp 4 on 21 May, Brupbacher died of acute mountain sickness (AMS) in her tent at Camp 3 at an altitude of 7400 m on the 22 May 2011.

References

1978 births
2011 deaths
Mountaineering deaths
People from the canton of Bern
Swiss mountain climbers